The Rathausplatz is a square in Vienna, Austria. The Rathausplatz is in the Innere Stadt, near the new Rathaus, after which it is named. Because of its size, its design and the architecture of the surrounding buildings it is one of the most important squares in central Vienna.

Squares in Vienna
Innere Stadt
Odonyms referring to a building